Silvia Hernández Enríquez (born 1948) is a Mexican politician affiliated with the Institutional Revolutionary Party (PRI) who served as Secretary of Tourism from December 1994 to December 1997.

Political career
Hernández, an active PRI member, has served in different positions within her party. In the early 1990s she was the leader of the PRI's National Confederation of Popular Organizations (CNOP).

She has a long career in the Mexican Congress serving as deputy in the lower house of the Congress and serving in the Mexican Senate three times.  In 1994 President Ernesto Zedillo Ponce de León appointed her as Secretary of Tourism.   In 2002 she served as Chairperson of the Inter-Parliamentary Forum of the Americas.

She has unsuccessfully tried to obtain her party's candidacy to the governorship of Querétaro.

References 

1948 births
Living people
Institutional Revolutionary Party politicians
Members of the Senate of the Republic (Mexico)
Mexican Secretaries of Tourism
Members of the Chamber of Deputies (Mexico)
Women members of the Senate of the Republic (Mexico)
21st-century Mexican politicians
21st-century Mexican women politicians
Women Secretaries of State of Mexico
Women members of the Chamber of Deputies (Mexico)